World Building can refer to:

 The New York World Building, the tallest building in New York City from 1890 to 1894.
 The Sun Tower in Vancouver, British Columbia, was known as the World Building until 1924.
 Worldbuilding, the process of constructing an imaginary world or milieux.